David S. Rust (born December 8, 1945) is an American politician. He is a member of the North Dakota State Senate from the 2nd District, serving since 2014. Rust previously served in the House of Representatives from 2008 to 2014. He is a member of the Republican party.

References

1945 births
Living people
Republican Party North Dakota state senators
Republican Party members of the North Dakota House of Representatives
People from McLean County, North Dakota
21st-century American politicians